Tremont House may refer to:

Canada
 Tremont House (Collingwood, Ontario), a historic building in the Collingwood Heritage Conservation District

United States
 Tremont House (Bellevue, Ohio), on the National Register of Historic Places
 Tremont House (Boston), the first hotel with indoor plumbing
 Tremont House (Chicago), 1860 Republican National Convention Headquarters
 Tremont House (Galveston), a historic hotel in the Strand Historic District